Ainsliaea elegans is a species of flowering plants in the family Asteraceae. It is found in China (Guizhou, Yunnan) and Vietnam.

References

External links 
 Ainsliaea elegans at The Plant List
 Ainsliaea elegans at efloras.org Floro of China

Plants described in 1902
Pertyoideae
Flora of Guizhou
Flora of Yunnan
Flora of Vietnam